Dig is an American alternative rock band from Los Angeles, California. Formed in 1991, they achieved success with their 1993 album Dig, which featured the charting single "Believe". The band then released the album Defenders of the Universe in 1996 to lesser success. It was followed by their third album Life Like in 1999, in which they then disbanded that same year. They reunited briefly from 2004 to 2008, and again in 2016. Vocalist/guitarist Scott Hackwith and guitarist Jon Morris are the only members to stay in the band for its entire run, although the current lineup also consists of original guitarist Johnny Cornwell, along with drummer Charlie George and bassist Tommy Black.

History
Dig formed in 1991 within Los Angeles, as vocalist Scott Hackwith had previously produced for The Ramones and had worked in the studio for various bands. Hackwith and drummer Anthony Smedile formed the band together, and they then recruited Jon Morris on guitar and backing vocals, Johnny Cornwell on guitar, and Phil Friedmann on bass. After releasing a demo EP in 1992 titled Runt, they signed with Radioactive Records and issued their first full-length album in 1993, the self-titled Dig. It was produced by Dave Jerden, who was well-known for producing '90s albums by bands such as Alice in Chains and Anthrax. The album peaked at No. 153 on the Billboard 200 and at No. 6 on the Billboard Heatseekers charts. The single "Believe" was played regularly on MTV's Buzz Bin and it had reached No. 19 on the Billboard Modern Rock Chart and at No. 34 on the Billboard Mainstream Rock Chart. Although "Believe" was the band's hit song, the record labels had done an unlikely move, and issued four other singles from the same album, although they all failed to chart in the United States. Overseas in the United Kingdom, Dig had fared a bit better on the UK Singles Chart, as "Believe" peaked at No. 83, "Unlucky Friend" peaked at No. 96, and "I'll Stay High" peaked at No. 97, all in 1994. The single "Unlucky Friend" had featured four tracks recorded by Dig while on Mark Radcliffe's FM radio show while they toured the UK. The band toured with the likes of Prong and Blind Melon to promote the album. Towards the end of 1994, Dig released the promotional Soft Pretzel EP, which included three original songs and also a Pink Floyd cover, "Fearless". Also in 1994, the band's song "Curious George Blues" was exclusively recorded for the soundtrack to the movie Airheads. The following year, their cover of the "Theme From Fat Albert" was included on the compilation Saturday Morning: Cartoons' Greatest Hits. They also recorded another exclusive song, "Hu Hu Hu", for the soundtrack of the movie Virtuosity.

From the beginning of 1995 until the middle of 1996, the band had not gone on any tours due to their prior exhaustive schedule; however, in 1996, they released their second album, Defenders of the Universe. The album was almost entirely mixed by Tom Lord-Alge, a mixer with hundreds of credits to his name. The album and its touring cycle had guitarist Cornwell replaced by Dix Denney, and drummer Smedile replaced by Matt Tecu. Unlike the previous album, none of the songs charted, and the album itself had not charted either. The following year, Dig's record label parent MCA had shifted them from Radioactive Records to their other imprint, Uptown Records.

After the label shift, the band released their third album Life Like in early 1999. Sylvia Massy took over mixing duties for the entirety. The album was recorded as a four-piece, since guitarist Denney left the band and both Hackwith and Morris handled guitar duties. Other changes in the lineup included original bassist Friedmann replaced by Jay Nicholas, and drummer Tecu replaced by Gene Trautmann. For the touring cycle, bassist Nicholas was replaced by Rob Redick, and guitarist Joel Graves was added into the band, to round out the five members; however, with a lack of support from the band's record label and only sporadic shows being played, the band was dropped from Uptown/MCA in July 1999, and the Uptown label itself officially went defunct later in the year. After the small touring cycle, new bassist Redick joined Candlebox and new drummer Trautmann joined Queens of the Stone Age. Original guitarist Morris had stepped away as well, and it signified the end of Dig.

In 2004, the band reappeared, and played sporadic one-off shows. The lineup included frontman Hackwith, original guitarists Morris and Cornwell, second drummer Tecu, and new bassist Jamie Carter; however, when 2007 rolled around, Tecu was replaced by Dave Stedronsky and Carter was replaced by prominent Rocket From the Crypt member Pete Reichert. They recorded the first new Dig song in years, titled "No One's There", and it appeared on a Poison Tree Records: Road to Nowhere compilation, alongside bands such as Fu Manchu and The Dwarves. Afterwards, various sessions of recording commenced; however, nothing ever surfaced.

In 2016, the band was revived yet again to play a singular show in West Hollywood. Along with Hackwith, Morris, and Cornwell, new bassist Marcus Blake and new drummer Charlie George had joined the lineup. After another period of only random updates, the band launched their own independent merch store in early 2020 and had started recording again, but with new bassist Tommy Black joining the band. In November 2020, the band announced a new album with an unknown release date, posting a sample on their official social media outlets. The album's first single, titled "Nothing Is Forever", was released in January 2021 with an accompanying music video. The second song, "Treatment", was released the following month with a music video as well.

Members

Current members
Scott Hackwith – vocals, guitars (1991–1999, 2004–2008, 2016–present)
Jon Morris – guitars (1991–1999, 2004–2008, 2016–present)
Johnny Cornwell – guitars (1991–1995, 2004–2008, 2016–present)
Charlie George – drums (2016–present)
Tommy Black – bass (2020–present)

Past members
Phil Friedmann – bass (1991–1997)
Anthony Smedile – drums (1991–1995)
Dix Denney – guitars (1995–1997)
Matt Tecu – drums (1995–1997, 2004–2006)
Jay Nicholas – bass (1997–1998)
Gene Trautmann – drums (1997–1999)
Joel Graves – guitars (1998–1999)
Rob Redick – bass (1998–1999)
Jamie Carter – bass (2004–2006)
Pete Reichert – bass (2006–2008)
Dave Stedronsky – drums (2006–2008)
Marcus Blake – bass (2016–2020)

Timeline

Discography
Studio albums
Dig (1993, Radioactive / MCA)
Defenders of the Universe (1996, Radioactive / MCA)
Life Like (1999, Uptown / Universal)

EPs and singles
Runt EP (1992, Wasteland)
"Feet Don't Touch the Ground" (1993, Wasteland)
"Fuck You" (1993, Radioactive)
"Believe" (1993, Radioactive)
"I'll Stay High" (1993, Radioactive)
"Unlucky Friend" (1994, Radioactive)
Soft Pretzel EP (1994, Radioactive)
"Whose Side You On?" (1996, Radioactive)
"Live in Sound" (1999, Universal)
"Nothing Is Forever" (2021, Cassette Recordings)

References

External links
 Official Dig Facebook
 Dig Fansite

Musical groups from Los Angeles
Rock music groups from California
Alternative rock groups from California
Musical groups established in 1991
Musical groups disestablished in 1999
Musical groups reestablished in 2006
American grunge groups
American shoegaze musical groups
1991 establishments in California